Cape Cairo is a peninsula in Qikiqtaaluk Region, Nunavut, Canada. It is located on eastern Ellef Ringnes Island.

References
 Atlas of Canada

Peninsulas of Qikiqtaaluk Region
Sverdrup Islands